Police is Charlie Chaplin's 14th film with Essanay Studios and was released in 1916.  It was made at the Majestic Studio in Los Angeles. Charlie plays an ex-convict who finds life on the outside not to his liking and leads him to breaking into a home with another thief (Wesley Ruggles). Edna Purviance plays the girl living in the home who tries to change him.

Synopsis
Charlie is released from prison and is immediately approached by a man who claims to be a church pastor (Billy Armstrong) who'll help him go straight. In reality, however, he's a scammer who frequently does disguises and swindles many other innocent people, including a drunk (James T. Kelley) who seems to be in little possession of his faculties.

At first Charlie remains nonchalant, not wanting to take any chances, especially not when he was just out of prison. However, the man, a skilled actor, goads him to cry. Charlie breaks out into tears stemming from regret for "doing it against Jesus". Of course, the man takes advantage of the situation and slips out the five dollar note Charlie has been given upon being discharged, leaving him penniless.

Now broke, Charlie goes to a fruit shop and starts biting into all the fruits there. He knows he has to pay for them all in the end, but, unaware that he has been swindled by the fake church pastor, eats more and more until the fruitseller (Leo White) becomes visibly angry. Charlie tells him to calm down, "I'll pay for it." He searches his pockets for the money, but, unfortunately, cannot find it. This angers the man, who by now has decided he'll get the money, even if it took him a month of Sundays. Charlie, realizing that he's not in a very good situation, runs away.

He is approached by the fake church pastor again, this time in a clean-shaven disguise. Charlie looks at him, and recognizes him right away. When this man starts suggesting that he help him go straight, Charlie realizes that this man is a fraud and fights him. In no mood for a fight, the man starts running, but Charlie follows suit, to scare this man a bit.

Unfortunately, a nearby constable (Fred Goodwins) sees Charlie chasing this seemingly well-wishing man, and joins the chase after thinking that Charlie means the man harm. Charlie stops a while after, obviously; however, he sees the policeman on his trail. Another chase begins, except this time Charlie is the chased.

After a long span of running, Charlie is tired. He decides to watch a film in the nearby cinema hall. A man (Paddy McGuire) stands in front of him, obstructing his way to the hall. Charlie tries to cut in front of him, however, the man shoves him back. "Get in line and wait for your turn."

A mild fight ensues. In the middle of it, guests start piling into the hall, cutting ahead in line. However, this seemingly righteous man does not seem aware of it, him fighting with Charlie and all that. When he does shift his attention back, everybody has gone in, and therefore, he is suspicious of nothing. Eventually, Charlie does cut ahead of him and walk in.

Unfortunately, upon entering, Charlie realizes that the fruitseller from earlier also was the ticket keeper of this cinema hall. He hopes to slip by; however, the shopkeeper recognizes him, and demands money for the ticket as well as the groceries. When Charlie fails to pay off either, he gets kicked out of the cinema hall in a hilarious slapstick way.

While walking back, Charlie meets his cell-mate (Wesley Ruggles), who's also been discharged. He convinces Charlie to help him burglarize a house. Broke, and vulnerable, Charlie agrees. Unbeknownst to them, however, a cop in his rounds (John Rand) is watching their every move, and has gotten to know of their burgling plans.

They decide to rob the house nearest. However, complications arise as they start having trouble breaking into the house. They can't seem to break in - it's just too difficult. Things get worse when the cop spying on them walks in on them, catching them red-handed, and their time seems to be up. Charlie, however, comes up with a plan. He asks him for a hammer, and when he's given the same, he knocks the policeman down unconscious.

Then, he proceeds to simply open the front door, as more of a last resort than anything. They enter with great caution. However, Charlie, clumsy as he is, bungles the entire operation up by collapsing the many glass plates and glasses, which shatter with deafening noise. Edna, who lives in the house that is being robbed, comes down to investigate. She is scared stiff, however, when she sees the duo robbing the place.

Once she regains full possession of her faculties, she steadily slithers up to the telephone and calls the police. Barely a few seconds after, however, Charlie's cell-mate finds her, and has been left with no choice but to hold her at gunpoint. She admonishes him with a fib that her mother is very ill and she'd die of the shock they might induce. Charlie and his companion believe her, and have lunch with her.

However, during lunch, Edna notices Charlie's behaviour and table manners. She's so taken with said manners that, by the time the police arrive to investigate the crime, she lies to them, stating that Charlie is her husband, and that Charlie's cellmate is the actual criminal. The police believe her, and laugh and joke with him. Once his former cellmate is arrested, she gives Charlie a dollar and sends him happily on his way.

Barely a few steps later, however, Charlie soon encounters the same nosy policeman from earlier, who recognizes him. Another chase begins.

Cast
 Charles Chaplin as Charlie, Convict 999 
 Edna Purviance as Daughter of the Houseowners
 Wesley Ruggles as Jailbird and Thief
 James T. Kelley as Drunk with Pockets Picked/Second Flophouse Customer
 Leo White as Fruitseller/Flop House Manager/Policeman
 John Rand as Nosy Policeman
 Fred Goodwins as Honest Preacher/Policeman with Monocle
 Billy Armstrong as Crooked Preacher/Second Cop
 Snub Pollard as Cop
 Bud Jamison as Third Flophouse Customer
 Paddy McGuire as Fifth Flophouse Customer
 George Cleethorpe as Policeman at Station with Mustache

Review
Reviewer Oscar Cooper wrote in Motion Picture News, "Those who believe that Chaplin's abilities are limited to the mallet, the kick and the spinal curvature walk, should see this picture.  They will be disillusioned.  They will see a touch of heart interest just at the end of the subject, and they will see that Charlie's stock pantomime includes pathos as well as fooling.  But of course, the picture is mainly clever horseplay, beginning with Charlie's exit from prison, and ending with his flight from a policeman."

External links

1916 films
1910s English-language films
Short films directed by Charlie Chaplin
American silent short films
American black-and-white films
1916 comedy films
Essanay Studios films
1916 short films
Silent American comedy films
Articles containing video clips
American comedy short films
1910s American films